Rapid City is an unincorporated community recognized as a local urban district that also once held town status in southwest Manitoba, Canada within the Rural Municipality of Oakview. It is located about 30 km north of Brandon. Rapid City is a farming community that is developed on the banks of the Little Saskatchewan River. The dam and reservoir in Rapid City were built by the province in 1961, the reservoir stores  and provides a water supply and recreational facility for the community.

History 
In the 1870s as the railroad expanded, settlers were drawn to the area to build their homes and set up their businesses.  The community was originally called Ralston's Colony (after John Ralston, an early settler). Around 1877 it was decided to rename the community Rapid City. Since the community was on the banks of the Little Saskatchewan River and it was a "rapid stream" they chose "rapid" and "city" reflecting the optimism of those early settlers. During the 1880s many awaited the arrival of the Canadian Pacific Railway lines Canadian transcontinental railway that would bring with it a certain building boom. While people assumed that the projected northerly route away from Portage la Prairie, Manitoba would take it through Rapid City and its narrow river crossing, the route suddenly changed to a more westerly route. This brought it through the location of present-day Brandon, resulting in the boom and growth of that city.

Education 
Rapid City Elementary School provides K-8 education for children in the community, and is part of the Rolling River School Division.

Demographics 

In 2011, the average dwelling is home to 2.3 people. The median value of a household in Rapid City is $100,317, almost three times lower than the national median at $280,552. The median income an individual makes is $27,088, and the median (after-tax) income in Rapid City is $43,199, lower than the national median at $54,089.

Almost every person in Rapid City reported their mother tongue as English (97.6%).

The 2011 National Household Survey reported that everyone in the community was White, however 13.3% of the population claim to have some Aboriginal ancestry.

56.0% of the residents are of a Christian faith, and 42.9% say they have no religious beliefs.

References 

Manitoba Community Profiles - Town of Rapid City

Designated places in Manitoba
Former towns in Manitoba
Local urban districts in Manitoba
Populated places disestablished in 2015
2015 disestablishments in Manitoba